The Ben Farès Mosque, also known as Djamaa Ben Farès, originally built as the Great Synagogue of Algiers, is a mosque and former synagogue in Algiers. It was also formerly known as Djamâa Lihoud, which means "Mosque of the Jews" in Algerian Arabic vernacular.

Following the  Civil war in Algeria and its abandonment in 1994, the synagogue was converted into the Ben Farès Mosque.

History

Synagogue 

The site of the synagogue was previously occupied by a mosque, which was founded in 1400 and named after Sidi Al Harbi, one of the saints of Algiers. After the French occupation of Algeria in 1830, the French sold the site to the Jews of Algeria, who destroyed the mosque and built a synagogue in its place in 1845.

As Ben Farès Mosque
Following the departure of the Jews of Algiers, who carried French nationality (since 1870 by the decree of Crémieux) with the French colonizers after the independence of Algeria for political reasons, the synagogue was transformed into a mosque called "The Mosque of Ben Farès."

The origin of the name of the mosque, according to what was indicated in the book of "mosques of the city of Algiers, its zaouïa and its sanctuaries in the Ottoman era" of Ben Hamoush, is attributed to the district in which lived Ali Abdul Aziz ibn Farès, who fled Andalusia after its fall in 1492 and who entered Bejaia and then in Algiers and settled in the Kasbah district.

Notable imams
 Mohamed Charef (1908-2011)

See also
 Algerian Islamic reference
 Hizb Rateb (Hezzab, Bash Hezzab, Salka)
 Lists of mosques
 List of mosques in Africa
 List of mosques in Algeria

References

Mosques in Algiers
Buildings and structures in Algiers
Former synagogues in Algeria
Mosques converted from synagogues